Ouo is a department or commune of Comoé Province in southern Burkina Faso. Its capital lies at the town of Ouo. According to the 1996 census the department has a total population of 15,594.

Towns and villages
 Ouo	(2 204 inhabitants) (capital)
 Balgogo	(558 inhabitants)
 Beguele	(418 inhabitants)
 Bini	(283 inhabitants)
 Dagninikorosso	(75 inhabitants)
 Dapala	(417 inhabitants)
 Gangasse	(539 inhabitants)
 Gonga	(126 inhabitants)
 Guedanga	(195 inhabitants)
 Inzele	(276 inhabitants)
 Kien	(194 inhabitants)
 Konamisse	(919 inhabitants)
 K’poum	(352 inhabitants)
 Logue	(1 093 inhabitants)
 Mado	(193 inhabitants)
 Minse	(201 inhabitants)
 Nerkedaga	(409 inhabitants)
 N’golofesso	(685 inhabitants)
 Norkama	(1 000 inhabitants)
 Pambie-Sokoura	(907 inhabitants)
 Poikoro	(527 inhabitants)
 Safia	(1 050 inhabitants)
 Sassamba	(719 inhabitants)
 Siekoro	(650 inhabitants)
 Sirakoro	(430 inhabitants)
 Sokourani	(246 inhabitants)
 Soucie	(697 inhabitants)
 Toukoro	(231 inhabitants)
 Goweyi, campement de Toukoro Comoé
 Bawé, village de Kpoum

References

Departments of Burkina Faso
Comoé Province